Milan Đukić may refer to:

Milan Đukić (politician), Croatian Serb politician
Milan Đukić (Vojvodina politician), Serbian politician in the province of Vojvodina
Milan Đukić (handballer), Serbian athlete